The Secret Garden is a 1993 fantasy drama film directed by Agnieszka Holland, executive-produced by Francis Ford Coppola and distributed by Warner Bros. under their Family Entertainment imprint. The movie stars Kate Maberly, Heydon Prowse, Andrew Knott, John Lynch, and Maggie Smith, was written by Caroline Thompson and based on the 1911 novel of the same name by Frances Hodgson Burnett. The novel was previously adapted into two films: a 1949 drama film and a 1919 silent film, which starred Lila Lee and Spottiswoode Aitken.

Set in Liverpool, England, Yorkshire's Allerton Castle was used for most of the exterior shots of Misselthwaite Manor, as well as interior shots. The film was a critical and commercial success. Maggie Smith was nominated for the BAFTA Award for Best Actress in a Supporting Role. In 2005, the British Film Institute included it in their list of the "50 films you should see by the age of 14".

Plot

In 1901, recently orphaned 10-year-old  Mary Lennox is sent from her home in British India to her uncle Lord Archibald Craven's mansion, Misselthwaite Manor, in Yorkshire, England. She was unloved and neglected by her parents, who were killed in an earthquake in India. As a result, Mary is cold, self-centered and so repressed that she is unable to cry.

Head housekeeper Mrs. Medlock informs Mary that her uncle, who spends most of his time away, will likely not see her. Mary hears strange sounds of crying in the house and discovers a hidden door in her room that leads to uninhabited areas, including her aunt's old room. There, she discovers a large key. Mrs. Medlock continuously sends Mary to play out on the grounds to keep her occupied whenever the crying starts in the house. Mary discovers her late Aunt Lilias' walled garden, which has been locked up since her death 10 years prior. She realizes that the key she found earlier unlocks the garden, but keeps it a secret. She befriends Dickon Sowerby, the younger brother of the manor's housemaid, Martha. Dickon is an outdoorsy boy who is good with animals. Mary and Dickon slowly clean up the secret garden, and Mary becomes happier. She also finally meets her uncle, who is sullen but kind.

Hidden away in the mansion is Lord Craven's son and Mary's cousin, Colin Craven, who has been treated like a sickly invalid his entire life. A spoiled, short-tempered boy, he has never left his room nor ever walked and is confined to his bed or a wheelchair. His father barely comes to see him in fear that Colin will die soon and he will lose his son. Mary eventually discovers Colin, learning that he was the source of the crying in the house. Although taken aback by his difficult nature, she puts her foot down and refuses to give in to his whims, showing him that he is not really sick. Encouraged by Mary, Colin goes outside for the first time and Mary and Dickon take him to the secret garden. 

The three children grow close and spend their free time in the garden everyday, where Colin, with their help, learns to walk. The trio keep all of this a secret from the staff. Colin wants his father to be the first one to see him on his legs. Lord Craven has a dream of Lilias calling him home and returns. In the secret garden, he sees Colin walking for the first time, leaving him speechless with joy. 

Mary bursts into tears for the first time in her life, certain that she is unwanted by her uncle and the garden will be locked up again as he had ordered it to be. Lord Craven reassures her that she is now part of the family. Promising never to lock it up again, he thanks her for bringing his family back to life. Dickon informs his older sister and the rest of the manor staff of the good news. The staff watches in shock and joy as Lord Craven and the children come home together.

The film ends with a voiceover of Mary stating that "If you look the right way, the whole world is a garden".

Cast

Production

Filming locations

Yorkshire's imposing Allerton Castle was used for most of the exterior shots of Misselthwaite Manor, and some of the interior was also used. Fountains Hall was also used for part of the exterior. Interiors of the former Midland Grand Hotel were used for filming as well, notably the scenes on the grand staircase.

Soundtrack
The film features the end credits song "Winter Light" performed by Linda Ronstadt, which is based on two themes from the score by Zbigniew Preisner. However, this song was not included in the film's original soundtrack release, but was in Ronstadt's eponymous album Winter Light. Sarah Brightman and the youngest member of Celtic Woman, Chloë Agnew, covered it for their albums; Brightman's Classics and Agnew's Walking In The Air. The soundtrack, released by Varèse Sarabande, contains the original score.

Release

Home media
The Secret Garden was originally released on VHS in the UK on 1 August 1994 and was re-released on 15 December 1997 by Warner Home Video.

Reception
Since its 1993 release, the film has garnered positive reviews. The review aggregator website Rotten Tomatoes reported that 88% of critics have given the film a positive review based on 42 reviews, with an average rating of 7.9/10. The site's critics consensus reads, "The Secret Garden honors its classic source material with a well-acted, beautifully filmed adaptation that doesn't shy from its story's darker themes". On Metacritic, the film has a weighted average score of 74 out of 100 based on 26 critics, indicating "generally favorable reviews". Audiences polled by CinemaScore gave the film an average grade of "A" on an A+ to F scale.

Desson Thomson of The Washington Post praised the acting by young actors, calling their acts "quite proficient and un-sappy too", but adding, "it's not their fault if they too often seem like chessmen being moved around on the director's board, composed into picturesque tableaux". Todd McCarthy of Variety wrote that "[the film is] executed to near perfection in all artistic departments", and called it "[a] superior adaptation", mentioning that "[the adaptation] of the perennial favorite novel will find its core public among girls, but should prove satisfying enough to a range of audiences".

Owen Gleiberman of Entertainment Weekly gave the film a "C+" and called it "earnest, heartfelt, and, for all its lavishness, rather plodding". Janet Maslin of The New York Times called this new adaptation of The Secret Garden "[an] elegantly expressive, a discreet and lovely rendering of the children's classic by Frances Hodgson Burnett".

Trevor Johnston of Time Out said that "With well-judged performances played straight, and topical subtexts (Green consciousness, the dysfunctional family), this 'children's' film sets no age limit on its potential audience".

The film grossed $31.2 million in the US and Canada. Internationally, it grossed $8.8 million for a worldwide total of $40 million.

Awards and nominations
Award wins
 Los Angeles Film Critics Association Award for Best Music – (Zbigniew Preisner)
Award nominations
 BAFTA Award for Best Actress in a Supporting Role - (Maggie Smith)

References

Bibliography

External links

 

1993 drama films
American children's drama films
1990s historical films
American Zoetrope films
Films about orphans
Films based on The Secret Garden
Warner Bros. films
Films scored by Zbigniew Preisner
Films set in country houses
Films set in India
Films set in Yorkshire
Films directed by Agnieszka Holland
Films shot at Pinewood Studios
Films with screenplays by Caroline Thompson
American drama films
British drama films
British historical films
1990s English-language films
1990s American films
1990s British films